The 2013–14 Biathlon World Cup – Sprint Women started on Friday November 29 in Östersund and finished Thursday March 20 in Holmenkollen. Defending titlist is Tora Berger of Norway.

Competition format
The 7.5 kilometres sprint race is the third oldest biathlon event; the distance is skied over three laps. The biathlete shoots two times at any shooting lane, first prone, then standing, totalling 10 targets. For each missed target the biathlete has to complete a penalty lap of around 150 metres. Competitors' starts are staggered, normally by 30 seconds.

2012–13 Top 3 Standings

Medal winners

Standings

References

Sprint Women